Systella  is an Asian genus of grasshoppers in the family Trigonopterygidae.  Species can be found from subcontinental India, through Indo-China and Malesia to New Guinea.

Species 
The Orthoptera Species file lists:
Systella annandalei Bolívar, 1905
Systella bolivari Willemse, 1928
Systella borneensis Willemse, 1930
Systella dusmeti Bolívar, 1905
Systella gestroi Bolívar, 1905
Systella philippensis Walker, 1870
Systella platyptera Haan, 1842
Systella rafflesii Westwood, 1841 - type species (location Sumatra)
Systella sarawakensis Willemse, 1930

Gallery

References

External links 
 
 

Caelifera genera
Orthoptera of Asia